White torture, often referred to as white room torture, is a type of psychological torture technique aimed at complete sensory deprivation and isolation. A prisoner is held in a cell that deprives them of all senses and identity. It is particularly used in Iran; however, there is also evidence of its use by the Venezuelan and the United States intelligence services.

Methodology 

Visually, the prisoner is deprived of all colour. Their cell is completely white: the walls, floor and ceiling, as well as their clothes and food. Neon tubes are positioned above the occupant in such a way that no shadows appear.

Auditorily, the cell is soundproof, and void of any sound, voices or social interaction. Guards stand in silence, wearing padded shoes to avoid making any noise. Prisoners cannot hear anything but themselves.

In terms of taste and smell, the prisoner is fed white food—classically, unseasoned rice—to deprive them of these senses. Further, all surfaces are smooth, robbing them of the sensation of touch.

Detainees are often held for months, or even years. The effects of white torture are well-documented in a number of testimonials. Typically, prisoners will become depersonalized by losing personal identity for extended periods of isolation. Other effects include hallucinations, or even psychotic breaks.

Allegations of use

Iran 
In Iran, white torture has been practiced on political prisoners. Most political prisoners who experience this type of torture are journalists held in the Evin prison. "Amir Fakhravar, the Iranian white room prisoner, was tortured [at Evin prison] for 8 months in 2004. He still has horrors about his times in the white room." According to Hadi Ghaemi, such tortures in Evin are not necessarily authorized directly by the Iranian government.

It can include prolonged periods of solitary confinement, the use of continual illumination to deprive sleep (listed in the Geneva Convention on Basic Human Rights, 1949) often in detention centers outside the control of the prison authorities, including Section 209 of Evin Prison.

Ahmed Shaheed, the UN special human rights reporter in Iran, mentioned in a statement that human rights activist Vahid Asghari was psychologically tortured by means of long-term detention in solitary confinement and with threats to arrest, torture or rape his family members. He was also reportedly tortured with severe beatings for the purpose of eliciting confessions.

A 2004 Amnesty International report documented the use of white torture on Amir Fakhravar by the Revolutionary Guards, the first known example of white torture in Iran It states that "his cells had no windows, and the walls and his clothes were white. His meals consisted of white rice on white plates. To use the toilet, he had to put a white piece of paper under the door. He was forbidden to speak, and the guards reportedly wore shoes that muffled sound". Upon his arrival in the US, Fakhravar confirmed this report in an interview with Christian Broadcasting Network.

In a telephone call to the Human Rights Watch in 2004, the Iranian journalist Ebrahim Nabavi said:

"Since I left Evin, I have not been able to sleep without sleeping pills. It is terrible. The loneliness never leaves you, long after you are 'free.' Every door that is closed on you.... This is why we call it 'white torture.' They get what they want without having to hit you. They know enough about you to control the information that you get: they can make you believe that the president has resigned, that they have your wife, that someone you trust has told them lies about you. You begin to break. And once you break, they have control. And then you begin to confess."

Kianush Sanjari, an Iranian blogger and activist who was tortured in 2006 reported:

"I feel that solitary confinement—which wages war on the soul and mind of a person—can be the most inhuman form of white torture for people like me, who are arrested solely for (defending) citizens' rights. I only hope the day comes when no one is put in solitary confinement [to punish them] for the peaceful expression of his ideas."

On December 20, 2018, Human Rights Watch urged the regime in Iran to investigate and find an explanation for the death of Vahid Sayadi Nasiri, who had been jailed for insulting the Supreme Leader Ali Khamenei. According to his family, Nasiri had been on a hunger strike but was denied medical attention before he died.

United States

The United States has been accused by Amnesty International and other international human rights organizations of using "extreme isolation and sensory deprivation... detainees confined to windowless cells... days without seeing daylight" along with other torture techniques with the approval of the George W. Bush administration under the euphemism "enhanced interrogation." The organization of European Democratic Lawyers (EDL) has explicitly accused the United States of white torture: "Fundamental rights are violated on the part of the United States. In Guantánamo, prisoners are held under sensory deprivation, ears and eyes covered, hands and feet tied, hands in thick gloves, held in cages without any privacy, always observed, light day and night: This is called white torture." Rainer Mausfeld has criticized the practice.

Venezuela 
According to human rights organizations and other NGOs, the Bolivarian Intelligence Service (SEBIN) of the Venezuelan government holds political prisoners in the lower levels of SEBIN's headquarters, which has been deemed by government officials "The Tomb". Such conditions have caused prisoners to become very ill, but they are denied medical treatment. Bright lights in the cells are kept on so prisoners lose their sense of time and the temperature is below freezing, with the only sounds heard being from the nearby Caracas Metro trains. Reports of torture in La Tumba, specifically white torture, are also common, with some prisoners attempting to commit suicide. Such conditions according to the NGO Justice and Process are to make prisoners plead guilty to the crimes that they are accused of.

In media
 German artist Gregor Schneider based his room design of "Weiße Folter" (lit. German for White torture) on this idea.
 The Brave (TV series) Episode 10 "Desperate Measures" January 8, 2018. A team member is held in an Iranian black site for interrogation. The room is all white, as is her and the guards clothing and the minimal furniture. The interrogator explains it is intended to cause sensory deprivation, and that bits of color will be added as she begins to cooperate.
 In the 2022 Indian film, Rorschach, the protagonist Luke Antony is subjected to White Room torture in Dubai Prison.

References

Mind control
Psychological torture techniques
Torture in Iran
Torture in Venezuela